The UA Little Rock William H. Bowen School of Law is a public law school, part of the University of Arkansas at Little Rock (UA Little Rock). The school is both American Bar Association (ABA) accredited and a member of the Association of American Law Schools (AALS).

The school awards the Juris Doctor (JD) degree in its full-time and part-time programs. It follows a traditional doctrinal curriculum while also blending hands-on practice into the student experience. The first year begins with the Bowen Student Success Program  and the Professional Mentor Program where students are matched with a practicing lawyer or judge. Before graduating, students are required to take skills courses such as Evidence and Lawyering Skills I & II, required to participate in an externship or clinic, and are encouraged to participate in the Bowen Concurrent Bar Preparation Program.

History

The first law school established in Arkansas was in Little Rock. However, politics caused the school faculty to reform themselves as a private law school in the 1910s. Subsequently, the state law school in Fayetteville was established. The private law school disbanded in the 1960s. The latest incarnation of the law school started as a part-time program that was an extension of the University of Arkansas at Fayetteville School of Law, and by 1975 was given autonomy and became a unit of the University of Arkansas at Little Rock.

The school resided in various locations, primarily the old Federal Courthouse in downtown Little Rock. The building was adjacent to the Pulaski County Courthouse, which afforded students the chance to see law in action. However, the facility was plagued with poor parking and was insufficient to handle the growing student population.

The law school's current campus is located adjacent to MacArthur Park, near the Arkansas Center for Fine Arts. The historic building was originally built for the medical school of the University of Arkansas for Medical Sciences and was extensively renovated in 1992 for the law school.

The law school is named after William H. Bowen, a former dean, and important figure in the administration of former Arkansas Governor and 42nd President of the United States, Bill Clinton.

Programs 
The  School offers the following course concentrations:

Alternative Dispute Resolution
Business & Commercial
Civil Practice
Civil Rights
Criminal Law
Elder Law
Environmental Law
Family Law
General Practice
Government Practice
Government Regulation
Health Care
Intellectual Property
International Law
Labor and Employment
Litigation
Real Estate
Skills
Taxation

Clinics

A law firm inside the law school, the Legal Clinic enables students to work with real clients, the community, and the court system. Below are the Clinics that students can participate in at the UA Little Rock, William H. Bowen School of Law:
Consumer Protection Clinic
Litigation Clinic
Delta Clinic
Tax Clinic
Mediation Clinic
Business Innovations Clinic
Veterans Legal Services Clinic
Special Education Mediation Clinic
General Pro-Bono Mediation Clinic
Early Intervention Mediation Clinic
Arkansas Youth Mediation Program

Admissions
Applications: 805
Enrolled: 158 (full-time 126, part-time 32)
GPA (75/50/25): 3.61/3.35/3.07
LSAT (75/50/25): 155/152/147
Bar Passage Rate: 81.6% (2017)

From 2015 through 2019 the Bowen School of Law saw a 120% increase in applications due to its Admissions 360 Initiative which provides access to pre-law resources to traditionally underserved applicants.

Campus

The law school is located in downtown Little Rock and is the only law school in Arkansas's capital city. It is just minutes from Arkansas's largest law firms, corporations, state and federal courts, and the Arkansas State Capitol building. Other attractions include MacArthur Park, Arkansas Center for Fine Arts, Clinton School of Public Service, World Services for the Blind, Heifer International, museums, restaurants, bars, breweries, Little Rock River Market District, East Village District, Hillcrest Historic District, and the Clinton Presidential Library.

The school is  home to the Pulaski County Law Library, making it the only metropolitan law school library that is also the library for a county.

The law school is housed separately from the main campus of the University of Arkansas at Little Rock, and is located at 1201 McMath Avenue.

Ranking
Best Value Law School - 2011-2018
Best Practical Training Law School
Best Public Interest Law School
Top Business Law School
Best Law School for Public Service
Top 20 Most Innovative Law Schools 
Most Influential People in Legal Education
Top 10 Law Schools with the Lowest Alumni Debt
Top 10 Lowest Tuition Rates
Best Schools for Public Service Careers
Top 12 Best Legal Writing Programs
Best Part-Time Programs
Best Law School for Public Service Careers
Top 5 Regional Law School for Latina/o Students
Top 5 Law Schools for Black Students in the Southern Region

Publications
The School of Law publishes three legal journals and a legal guidebook:
The Journal of Appellate Practice and Process
UALR Law Review
Arkansas Journal of Social Change and Public Service
Legal Guide for Arkansas Nonprofit and Volunteer Organizations

Costs
Full-Time Tuition for residents is $16,041 and non-residents is $31,984. Part-Time Tuition for residents is $10,605 and non-residents is $20.948. The law school offers scholarships up to full tuition.  The law school tuition is the lowest in Arkansas and is among the lowest in the nation. Bowen Law is ranked as one of the 10 lowest alumni debt upon graduation by the USNWR, and ranks as the 6th lowest Law School Transparency estimated debt-financed cost of attendance.

Employment 
According to Bowens's official 2015 ABA-required disclosures, 52% of the Class of 2015 obtained full-time, long-term, JD-required employment nine months after graduation.

Student organizations
The law school has over forty five student organizations. These include the American Bar Association Law Student Division (ABA/LSD), American Constitution Society, Arkansas Association of Women Lawyers-Law Student Division, Arkansas Bar Association Law Student Division (ABA/LSD), Arkansas Trial Lawyers Association, Asian Pacific American Law Student Association (APALSA), Black Law Students Association, Bowen Athletic Department, Bowen Lambda, Christian Legal Society, Delta Theta Phi Legal Fraternity (DTP), Environmental Law Society, Federalist Society, Hispanic Law Students Association (HLSA), Intellectual Property Law Society, International Law Society, Irish American Law Students Society (ILSS), J. Reuben Clark Society, Law Review, Moot Court Board, OutLaw Legal Society, Out of State Student Association (OSSA), Phi Alpha Delta (PAD), Part-time Student Association (PTSA), Pulaski County Bar Association, Student Division (PCBA), Public Interest Law Society (PILS), Sports and Entertainment Law Society (SELS), "Street Law" Mentor Program (Street Law), Student Animal Legal Defense Fund (SALDF), Student Bar Association (SBA), Young Democrats, and Young Republicans.

Notable faculty

Current
Vic Fleming, district judge for the City of Little Rock
Robin F. Wynne, Associate Justice for the Supreme Court of Arkansas

Former
Morris S. "Buzz" Arnold, a judge of the United States Court of Appeals for the Eighth Circuit
Dan Greenberg, former member of the Arkansas House of Representatives
Paula J. Casey, former U.S. Attorney for the Eastern District of Arkansas

Notable alumni
Annabelle Clinton Imber Tuck, first female Arkansas Supreme Court Justice
Rhonda K. Wood Associate Justice on the Arkansas Supreme Court
Leslie Rutledge, Arkansas Attorney General
Davy Carter (Class of 2005, born 1975), Speaker of the Arkansas House of Representatives
Osro Cobb (Class of 1929, 1904–1996), Republican politician, U.S. attorney for the United States District Court for the Eastern District of Arkansas
Bud Cummins (born 1959), former U.S. Attorney for the Eastern District of Arkansas
Lynn A. Davis (Class of 1975, 1933–2011), (former U.S. marshal for the Eastern District of Arkansas; crime author
Vic Fleming (born 1951), district judge for the City of Little Rock
Michael John Gray (born c. 1976), Democratic member of the Arkansas House of Representatives from Woodruff County since 2015; farmer with a law degree
Dan Greenberg, former member of the Arkansas House of Representatives
Douglas House (Class of 1980, born 1953), member of the Arkansas House of Representatives from Pulaski and Faulkner counties
 Dustin McDaniel, Attorney General of Arkansas
Sheffield Nelson, (born 1940), Arkansas Republican National Committeeman; gubernatorial candidate in 1990 and 1994, chairman of Arkansas Louisiana Gas Company
Andree Layton Roaf (1941–2009), first African-American woman to serve on the Arkansas Supreme Court
Vic Snyder (born 1947), former U.S. Representative for Arkansas's 2nd congressional district
Wallace Townsend (Class of 1906, 1882–1979), Republican national committeeman from Arkansas (1928–1961), Republican gubernatorial nominee in 1916 and 1920, Little Rock lawyer until he was ninety-two
Mary Wiseman (born 1961), Judge of the Montgomery County (Ohio) Court of Common Pleas
Michael Lamoureux (born 1976), Member of the Arkansas Senate and Current Senate Pro Tem
J. Cody Hiland, US Attorney for the Eastern District of Arkansas

References

External links
 

Little Rock
Educational institutions established in 1975
1975 establishments in Arkansas
University of Arkansas at Little Rock